Nathan or Nate Hill may refer to:
Nate Hill (1966–2012), American football player
Nate Hill (artist) (born 1977), American performance artist
Nathan Hill (writer), author of 2017 novel The Nix
Nathan W. Hill (born 1979), American historical linguist and Tibetologist

See also
Nathaniel Hill (disambiguation)
Nathan Hills, New Zealand